250 City Road is a residential-led scheme under construction in the borough of Islington, London, designed by Foster + Partners and developed by Berkeley. It was given planning permission in 2014 by the then London Mayor Boris Johnson after being rejected by Islington Council.

Phase one started in 2015. Upon completion, the development will have two towers of 43 and 36 storeys, 930 apartments and a 190-room hotel.

Background 
In 2011, developer Berkeley acquired the 1.9 hectare 250 City Road site, which had been a business park since the 1980s. The site came with planning permission, granted in 2010, for a new development designed by BUJ Architects. The proposal included a 27-storey tower, 700 homes, offices as well as retail and restaurant space. However, Berkeley started work on new plans in collaboration with architect firm DSDHA.

In 2012, architects Foster + Partners took over the design for the new scheme. In 2013, Berkeley applied for planning permission for the development but it was rejected by Islington Council. In December 2013, London Mayor at the time, Boris Johnson, reviewed the decision and gave the development approval in April 2014.

The proposals include two towers of 150 m (509 ft) and 137 m (449 ft) containing 42 and 36 floors, with the taller building named Carrara Tower, and the smaller named Valencia Tower. In total, the development will have 930 apartments as well as a 190-room hotel, office and retail space.

Construction 
Phase one of the development, which includes the construction of the tallest tower, began in March 2015 and was expected to be completed in December 2017.

See also 
List of tallest buildings and structures in London
List of tallest buildings in the United Kingdom

Notes and references 

Skyscrapers in the London Borough of Islington
Proposed skyscrapers in London